Platypelis alticola is a species of frog in the family Microhylidae.
It is endemic to Madagascar.
Its natural habitat is subtropical or tropical moist montane forests.
It is threatened by habitat loss.

Sources

a
Endemic frogs of Madagascar
Endangered fauna of Africa
Species endangered by habitat loss
Amphibians described in 1974
Taxa named by Jean Marius René Guibé
Taxonomy articles created by Polbot
Taxobox binomials not recognized by IUCN